Günter Kaslowski (5 July 1934 – 26 June 2001) was a German cyclist. He competed in the sprint event at the 1960 Summer Olympics.

References

External links
 

1934 births
2001 deaths
German male cyclists
Olympic cyclists of the United Team of Germany
Cyclists at the 1960 Summer Olympics
Cyclists from Berlin